Brampton, also known as Buena Vista Farm, is a historic home located near Orange, in Madison County, Virginia. It was built about 1846, as a two-bay, side passage plan with a flat roof, two-story portico, and a small wing. It is a temple-form Greek Revival-style residence. A rear addition was built about 1900, and the front portico was redesigned with a pedimented form.  Also on the property are the contributing brick kitchen, smokehouse, and dairy.

It was listed on the National Register of Historic Places in 1985.

References

Houses on the National Register of Historic Places in Virginia
Greek Revival houses in Virginia
Houses completed in 1846
Houses in Madison County, Virginia
National Register of Historic Places in Madison County, Virginia
1846 establishments in Virginia